Yassine Bensghir (born 3 January 1983) is a Moroccan middle distance runner who specializes in the 1500 metres. He was born in Rabat.

His personal best time over the distance is 3:33.04 minutes, achieved in July 2007 in Monaco.

The IAAF announced in July 2016 that Bensghir had been banned from competition for 4 years after abnormalities had been detected in his biological passport. His results from 7 June 2014 onwards were annulled. The ban ends 11 April 2020.

Competition record

References

External links
 
 
 
 

1983 births
Living people
Sportspeople from Rabat
Moroccan male middle-distance runners
Olympic athletes of Morocco
Athletes (track and field) at the 2008 Summer Olympics
World Athletics Championships athletes for Morocco
Mediterranean Games silver medalists for Morocco
Athletes (track and field) at the 2013 Mediterranean Games
Doping cases in athletics
Moroccan sportspeople in doping cases
Mediterranean Games medalists in athletics
20th-century Moroccan people
21st-century Moroccan people